Stone House is a 16th-century sandstone farmhouse next to Birmingham Road in Allesley, Coventry. It is Grade II* listed for a number of architectural features, as well as its good condition.

History
Stone House was built in c.1557 for John Milward. The freehold was bought from him in 1608 by a new owner who had the initials "WNC" and the date carved in a tablet over the porch. The building was Grade II* listed on 24 June 1974.

Architecture
The house contains features from various phases of building work through the 16th and 17th centuries. There is an original 16th century doorway at the rear of the house, and an ashlar plinth from this period surrounds the main block of the house. The north wing is rendered with roughcast, which may have originally been used on the whole building. The front section of the house is now bare sandstone. The garden is walled with 16th and 17th century elements, and the gate piers bear 18th century ball finials.

See also
Golden Cross Inn, Coventry - another Grade II* listed building of a similar age in Coventry
Ford's Hospital, Coventry - a Grade I listed half-timbered almshouse in the city centre, also 16th century

References

Buildings and structures in Coventry
Grade II* listed buildings in the West Midlands (county)
Grade II* listed buildings in Warwickshire